"Promise" (stylized as "promise") is a song recorded by Japanese singer-songwriter Kohmi Hirose, from her seventh studio album, Rhapsody. It was released on November 27, 1997 by Victor Entertainment as the album's second single. It is Hirose's second best-single, behind "Romance no Kamisama", selling over 600,000 copies. Promise was featured in commercials for the Alpen company's 1998 winter campaign.

Internet meme
The song was popularized on the Internet through its use in the  meme on Nico Nico Douga and then YouTube. The meme originated from glitchy gameplay footage from the Nintendo 64 game GoldenEye 007 produced from an improperly-inserted cartridge. People imitated the glitch through stop motion and then overlaid with the chorus of "Promise".

Chart performance
"Promise" entered the Oricon Singles Chart at number 14, with 32,000 copies sold. The song climbed one spot to number 13 in its second week, selling 34,000 copies, and again to number 12 on its third week, selling 42,000 copies. "Promise" peaked at number four on its fourth charting week, with 69,000 copies sold. It spent the following four weeks within the top ten, selling 244,000 copies. The single charted for a total of sixteen weeks, selling a reported total of 542,000 copies. It peaked at number ten on the monthly Oricon Singles Chart for the month of January 1998 and charted at number 45 on the year-end Oricon Singles Chart for the year 1998.

Track listing

Charts

Certification

|-
! scope="row"| Japan (RIAJ)
| Platinum
| 542,000
|-
! scope="row"| Japan (RIAJ)
| Gold
| 100,000* (digital)
|-

References

1997 songs
1997 singles
Kohmi Hirose songs
Internet memes
Song recordings produced by Kohmi Hirose
Songs written by Kohmi Hirose
Victor Entertainment singles